Jonas Hassen Khemiri (born December 27, 1978) is a Swedish writer.

Khemiri is the author of four novels, six plays, and a collection of essays, short stories and plays. His work has been translated into more than 25 languages. He has received the August Prize for fiction and a Village Voice Obie Award for best script. In 2017 he became the first Swedish writer to have a short story published in the New Yorker.

Education 
Khemiri studied literature at Stockholm University and international economics at the Stockholm School of Economics.

Career

Novels 
Khemiri's debut novel, Ett öga rött (One Eye Red), was published in 2003. It sold over 200,000 copies in Sweden, was adapted into a movie and became the best-selling novel of any category in 2004.

Khemiri's second novel, Montecore: en unik tiger (Montecore - The Silence of the Tiger), received the Sveriges Radio Award for Best Swedish Novel of 2007. It was a finalist for the August Prize and translated into more than 20 languages. In the US, Montecore was translated by Rachel Willson-Broyles and published by Knopf and the New York Times described the novel as "funny, ambitious and inventive. Also black: rage and tragedy pulse beneath the fireworks." In 2011, the novel was chosen by the critics at Dagens Nyheter as one of the top 10 works of fiction, published in Sweden in 2000–2010.

In 2009 Khemiri released Invasion!, a collection of short stories, essays and plays.

Khemiri's third novel, Jag ringer mina bröder (I Call My Brothers), was published in 2012. It was adapted for television by SVT.

Khemiri's fourth novel, Allt jag inte minns (Everything I Don't Remember) was published in 2015. It became a national best-seller and received Sweden's most prestigious literary award, the August Prize, for best fiction. The novel has been translated into more than 25 languages. Joyce Carol Oates chose it as one of her three favourite books of 2016, calling it "enigmatic" in the Times Literary Supplement. Masha Gessen picked it as her favourite book of 2017 for Politico.

Plays 
Khemiri's first play, Invasion!, premiered at the Stockholm City Theatre in 2006. It was chosen for the 2007 Swedish Theater Biennial and has since then been performed in 12 countries. The first US production of Invasion! was produced by the Play Company, and in 2011, the play received a Village Voice Obie Award for best script. It was published in English by Samuel French and in German by Theater Heute. The production at Thalia Theater in Hamburg ran from 2009–2016.

Khemiri's second play Fem gånger Gud (God Times Five) toured Sweden in 2008 and the third play, Vi som är hundra (The Hundred We Are), premiered at Gothenburg City Theatre in 2009. In Norway the play won the Hedda Award, Norway's top theatrical award, for best play of 2010.

Apatiska för nybörjare (Apathy for Beginners), Khemiri's fourth play, premiered at the big stage of Folkteatern in Gothenburg in 2011 and has been performed in Italy, Norway and Germany. SVT adapted the play for Swedish television.

In 2013 Khemiri adapted the novel Jag ringer mina bröder (I Call My Brothers) into a play. It toured Sweden with Riksteatern, had a second premier at the Stockholm City Theatre and has been performed in Norway, Denmark, Germany, the UK and Australia. In the UK, the play was staged by Volta International Festival at the Arcola Theatre in 2015 and at the Gate Theatre in 2016. It was published in English by Oberon Books.

Khemiri's latest play, ≈ [ungefär lika med] (≈[Almost Equal To]) premiered at the Royal Dramatic Theatre  in 2014. In 2015, Khemiri received the Expressen Theatre Prize. The play has been performed in Norway, Denmark, Germany (multiple versions), Iceland, Belgium and the US. It is currently being performed at the Schaubühne in Berlin, and at the Pillsbury House Theatre, in Minneapolis, US.

Other writing 
Khemiri's story "Unchanged, unending" was originally published in Aftonbladet, and won the Swedish Radio prize for best short story in 2008. Later that year Khemiri met and interviewed the rapper Nas for a portrait in Dagens Nyheter. In 2013 Khemiri started a writing workshop for people who are living or have experienced living as undocumented migrants in Sweden. Texts from three participants of the workshop were published in Swedish by Aftonbladet, Norwegian by Klassekampen and English by the literary journal Asymptote.

In 2013, Khemiri wrote an open letter to Sweden's Minister of Justice Beatrice Ask in response to a controversial police program, REVA. The letter, titled "Dear Beatrice Ask", started a debate about discrimination and racial profiling in Sweden. Originally published in Dagens Nyheter, the letter became a social media phenomenon, with more than 150 000 shares on Facebook (summer 2014) and more than half a million clicks on the article online. It is one of the most shared articles in Swedish history. According to social media analysts the letter reached more or less every Twitter user in Sweden. The original text was translated into more than 20 languages, and a version of the text was published by the New York Times in April 2013.

In 2017, Khemiri's short story "Så som du hade berättat det för mig (ungefär) om vi hade lärt känna varandra innan du dog" ("As You Would Have Told It to Me (Sort Of) If We Had Known Each Other Before You Died") was published by the New Yorker. Khemiri is the first Swedish writer to publish a short story in the magazine, although it has previously featured poetry by Swedish poet Tomas Tranströmer.

Personal life
Khemiri is based in Stockholm. His younger brother is actor Hamadi Khemiri. Through his father, Khemiri is cousin of award-winning performance artist Slim Khezri.

Fiction
 Ett öga rött (One Eye Red, novel, 2003)
 Montecore : en unik tiger (Montecore - the Silence of the Tiger, novel, Knopf, 2006)
 Invasion! : pjäser, noveller, texter (Invasion! Collection of plays, short stories and essays, 2008)
 Jag ringer mina bröder (I Call My Brothers, novel, 2012)
 Allt jag inte minns (Everything I Don't Remember, novel, Atria/Scribner 2015), translated by Rachel William-Broyles
 Så som du hade berättat det för mig (ungefär) om vi hade lärt känna varandra innan du dog (As You Would Have Told It to Me (Sort Of) If We Had Known Each Other Before You Died, short story, the New Yorker, 2017)
 Pappaklausulen (The Family Clause, 2018), translated by Alice Menzies

Plays 
 Invasion! (Invasion!, 2006)
 Fem gånger Gud (Five Time God, 2008) 
 Vi som är hundra (The Hundred We Are, 2009) 
 Jag ringer mina bröder (I Call My Brothers, 2013)
 Apatiska för nybörjare (Apathy for Beginners, 2011)
 ≈ [ungefär lika med] (≈ [Almost Equal To], 2014)

Awards
 2004 Borås Tidning's Prize, best Swedish literary debut for Ett öga rött (One Eye Red)
 2006 Per Olov Enquist's Literary Prize for Montecore
 2006 VI magazine Literary Prize for Montecore
 2006 Sweden Radio Novel Prize for Montecore (2006)
 2007 Stipend from the Gerard Bonnier Fund of the Swedish Academy
 2007 The Bellman Prize
 2008 Swedish Radio's Prize for best Swedish Short Story for "Oändrat oändlig" (2008)
 2010 Hedda Award, best play (Norway) for Vi som är hundra (The Hundred We Are)
 2010 John Fante Literary Prize (Italy) for Montecore
 2011 Village Voice Obie Award (US) for best script: Invasion!
 2011 Swedish Ibsen Prize for playwriting.
 2013 Swedish Library's Aniara Prize for Jag ringer mina bröder (I Call My Brothers)
 2015 Expressens Theatre Prize for ≈ [ungefär lika med] (≈[Almost Equal To])
 2015 August Prize for Allt jag inte minns (Everything I Don’t Remember)
 2017 Premio Strega Europeo Award (Italy), finalist for Allt jag inte minns (Everything I Don’t Remember)
 2021 Prix Médicis étranger for La clause paternelle (The Family Clause)

International residencies
 Ledig House, Hudson, New York (2004)
 International Residency for Emerging Playwrights at Royal Court, London (2006)
 DAAD, Writer in Residence, Berlin (2009)

References

External links
 Official homepage
 Subversive Tongue and a Sharp Focus on Identity Politics, interview with the New York Times September 8, 2011.
 Key Note at the Library of Congress Book Festival, Washington DC, 2016 (video) 
 This Week in Fiction, interview with the New Yorker, September 24, 2017.

1978 births
Living people
21st-century Swedish male writers
21st-century Swedish dramatists and playwrights
Swedish male novelists
Swedish short story writers
Swedish people of Tunisian descent
August Prize winners
Prix Médicis étranger winners
Stockholm University alumni
Stockholm School of Economics alumni
Writers from Stockholm
Swedish male dramatists and playwrights